The Gallatin County Courthouse, at 301 W. Main in Bozeman, Montana, is an Art Deco style courthouse built in 1935–36.  It was listed on the National Register of Historic Places in 1987.

It is the most notable example of Art Deco style in Bozeman.  It was designed, perhaps as early as 1933, by local architect Fred F. Willson, who practiced in Bozeman from 1900 to 1956.

References

External links

County courthouses in Montana
National Register of Historic Places in Gallatin County, Montana
Art Deco architecture in Montana
Government buildings completed in 1935
Courthouses on the National Register of Historic Places in Montana
Buildings and structures in Bozeman, Montana
1935 establishments in Montana